Idriz Hošić (born 17 February 1944) is a Bosnian retired footballer. He participated in UEFA Euro 1968.

Club career
During his club career, he played for NK Famos Hrasnica, FK Partizan, 1. FC Kaiserslautern and MSV Duisburg.

International career
He made his debut for Yugoslavia in an April 1968 friendly match away against Czechoslovakia and has earned a total of 2 caps, scoring no goals. His other international was a June 1968 European Championship match against Italy.

References

External links

Idriz Hošić at Serbian Federation site 

1944 births
Living people
People from Prijedor
Association football forwards
Yugoslav footballers
Yugoslavia international footballers
UEFA Euro 1968 players
FK Famos Hrasnica players
FK Partizan players
1. FC Kaiserslautern players
MSV Duisburg players
SC Westfalia Herne players
Yugoslav First League players
Bundesliga players
Bosnia and Herzegovina expatriate footballers
Expatriate footballers in Germany
Yugoslav expatriate sportspeople in Germany